The Ministry of Justice of Bahrain was established shortly after Bahrain achieved independence in 1971, to replace the Department of Justice. The Ministry oversees all administrative aspects related to the court system in the country while keeping contact with the Supreme Council of the Judiciary and all relevant bodies in the justice system and law enforcement.

In 2005, the name of the Ministry was changed to Ministry of Justice, Islamic Affairs and Endowments due to the added task of regulating and supervising political affiliations.

All members of the Al Khalifa royal family are members of the civil judiciary.

List of ministers

See also 

 Justice ministry
 Politics of Bahrain

References 

Justice
Justice ministries